Stenoptilia kosterini is a moth of the family Pterophoridae. It is found in Kamchatka, Russia.

References

Moths described in 2001
kosterini
Moths of Asia